{{DISPLAYTITLE:C6H12N2O3}}
The molecular formula C6H12N2O3 (molar mass: 160.17 g/mol, exact mass: 160.0848 u) may refer to:

 Daminozide
 Gamma-Glutamylmethylamide